Battle of Drava may refer to:

 Battle of the Transdanubian Hills, 1945 World War II operation
 Battle of Drava River (925), medieval conflict